Ruslan Muratovich Daurov (born 11 September 2002) is a Russian football player. He plays for FC Alania Vladikavkaz and FC Alania-2 Vladikavkaz.

Club career
He made his debut for the main team of PFC CSKA Moscow on 23 September 2021 in a Russian Cup game against FC Zenit-Izhevsk.

Career statistics

References

External links
 
 
 

2002 births
Sportspeople from Vladikavkaz
Living people
Russian footballers
Association football midfielders
FC Spartak Vladikavkaz players
PFC CSKA Moscow players
Russian First League players
Russian Second League players